Pothos may refer to:
 Pothos (mythology), a character in Greek mythology
 Pothos (plant), a genus of plants
 Epipremnum aureum, a plant often grown indoors (formerly grouped within the genus Pothos and commonly known as "pothos")
 A statue by Scopas

See also
 Pothos Argyros
 Pathos